Jim Jeffords State Forest covers  in Mendon and Shrewsbury, Vermont. 
The forest connects Aitken State Forest, to the east, and Calvin Coolidge State Forest, to the west, contributing to the conservation of an important wildlife corridor. 

Public access to Jim Jeffords State Forest is from Moonshine Lane and North Branch Roads off the Upper Cold River Road in Shrewsbury.

The forest was created in 2016 and named after Shrewsbury resident state senator Jim Jeffords, who was noted for his legacy of environmental stewardship and land conservation. It is managed for recreation, wildlife habitat protection, sustainable timber harvesting, and water quality protection.

Activities in the forest include hiking along woods roads, hunting, fishing and trapping, snowmobiling, cross-country skiing and snowshoeing. No roads are plowed in winter within the state forest.

References

External links
Official website

Vermont state forests
Protected areas of Rutland County, Vermont
Mendon, Vermont
Shrewsbury, Vermont
Protected areas established in 2016
2016 establishments in Vermont